Lafe is a given name.

People with the given name include:

 Lafayette Blanchard Gleason (1863–1937), American politician
 Lafe McKee (1872–1959), American actor
 Lafe Pence (1857–1923), American politician
 Lafe Solomon, the National Labor Relations Board's Acting General Counsel in 2010
 Charles Lafayette Todd (1911–2004), American folklorist
 Lafe Ward (1925–2013), American politician and lawyer

given names